South Bellevue station will be an elevated Sound Transit East Link light rail station in the city of Bellevue, Washington. It is expected to open along with the section of the line to Overlake in 2024.

Location 
The station will be located on the east side of Bellevue Way SE in the 2600 block. This location is adjacent to South Bellevue Park & Ride and the Mercer Slough.

References 

Future Link light rail stations
Link light rail stations in King County, Washington
Buildings and structures in Bellevue, Washington
Railway stations scheduled to open in 2024